David Hawksworth may refer to:
 David Hawksworth, chef of Hawksworth Restaurant in Vancouver, Canada
 David Leslie Hawksworth (born 1946), British mycologist and lichenologist